Crowd Scene is an album by jazz pianist Mal Waldron recorded in 1989 and released on the Italian Soul Note label.

Reception
The Allmusic review by Scott Yanow awarded the album 4 stars, stating: "there are some rambling moments on these lengthy performances, both of which clock in at over 25 minutes. Still, it is often fascinating to hear what the musicians come up with during these go-for-broke improvisations".

Track listing
All compositions by Mal Waldron
 "Crowd Scene" — 26:50  
 "Yin And Yang" — 25:26
Recorded in New York City on June 10, 1989

Personnel
Mal Waldron — piano
Sonny Fortune — alto saxophone
Ricky Ford — tenor saxophone
Reggie Workman — bass
Eddie Moore — drums

References

1988 albums
Mal Waldron albums
Black Saint/Soul Note albums